Mahdi Karim Ajeel (born December 10, 1983 in Iraq) is a former Iraqi footballer. He last played as a winger for Al-Talaba in Iraq and the Iraq national football team.

Player info
Mahdi Kareem Ajeel's successful conversion to a right winger initially came as a result of his failure claim a more central striking role in the face of competition from the likes of Younis Mahmoud. Kareem's club career began with Al Naft, where he displayed his predatory instincts by scoring regularly for the local powerhouse. However, his career as a centre-forward effectively ended when he moved to Al Talaba in 2002.

With Alaa Kadhim, Younis Mahmoud and Ahmed Salah all in their prime and ahead of Kareem in the pecking order for a starting place, the youngster found himself switched to the right wing. Not that it took long for the versatile player to adapt to his new position; indeed, it was on the wing that Kareem really came into his own.

Having thrived in his new role at the club level, he quickly broke into the Iraqi Olympic team under Adnan Hamad. There, he formed one half of a dynamic wing duo with Hawar Mulla Mohammed, whose surging down the left flank were as significant as Kareem's in breaking down opposition defences. Both figured prominently with the Iraq junior side as they came through Asia's hard-fought qualifying round to book an appearance at the 2004 Athens Olympics, where they would stun the watching world by storming into the last four.

The high point of Kareem's international career arrived later in the year when Iraq won their first continental title at year's AFC Asian Cup. He also figured prominently in Iraq's qualifying campaign for the 2010 FIFA World Cup in South Africa, scoring four times in the 7–0 victory over Pakistan. This display helped earn him a move to Al Ahly Tripoli, where he has scored 11 times in 18 appearances. Then he went to the Qatari Club Al-Khor, where he had a great season. In 2009, Iraq played disastrous Gulf Cup. After that he moved to the Iraqi club Arbil FC. He made great matches in the AFC Cup against Al-Kuwait, where he also scored a goal.

International goals
Scores and results list Iraq's goal tally first.

Honours

Club 
Iraqi Premier League
Winner: 1
2011–12 with Erbil
Iraq FA Cup
Winner: 1
2002–03 with Al-Talaba
Iraqi Super Cup
Winner: 1
2002 with Al-Talaba
Cypriot First Division
Winner: 1
2005–06 with Apollon Limassol
Cypriot Super Cup
Winner: 1 
2006 with Apollon Limassol

Country 
 4th place in 2004 Athens Olympics
 2007 Asian Cup winner
 2012 Arab Nations Cup Bronze medallist

Individual 
 Champion with Apollon Limassol FC (CYP) in 2005-2006
 Best Foreign Player (Libyan Premier League 2007-08) (voting sponsored by Libyana and Al-Madar)
 Goal of the Season (Libyan Premier League 2007-08, against Al-Madina) (voting sponsored by Libyana and Al-Madar)

See also
 List of men's footballers with 100 or more international caps

References

External links 
 
 Profile on Iraqsport

1983 births
Living people
Iraqi expatriate footballers
Iraq international footballers
Apollon Limassol FC players
Association football midfielders
2004 AFC Asian Cup players
Footballers at the 2004 Summer Olympics
2007 AFC Asian Cup players
2009 FIFA Confederations Cup players
2011 AFC Asian Cup players
AFC Asian Cup-winning players
Iraqi footballers
Olympic footballers of Iraq
Sportspeople from Baghdad
Al-Khor SC players
Erbil SC players
Expatriate footballers in Cyprus
Expatriate footballers in Qatar
Footballers at the 2014 Asian Games
Cypriot First Division players
Asian Games medalists in football
Al-Talaba SC players
FIFA Century Club
Al-Shorta SC players
Asian Games bronze medalists for Iraq
Medalists at the 2014 Asian Games